Harold Holmes may refer to:

People
Harold Holmes (boxer), British boxer in the 1908 Summer Olympics
Harold Holmes (rugby league)
Harold Holmes, architect of Ankeny Building
Harold Holmes (political candidate), see Electoral results for the Division of Bass

Other uses
Harold Holmes Library

See also

Harry Holmes (disambiguation)
Harry (disambiguation)
Holmes (disambiguation)
Hal Holmes (1902–1977), U.S. Representative from Washington